Talafi is a Pakistani drama serial produced by Humayun Saeed and Shehzad Nasib and aired on PTV Home in 2012.

Reviews
Talafi became the top rated drama on PTV Network easily due to brisk pace of the plot and performance of the cast. Gaining respectable viewership across Pakistan despite facing stiff competition from satellite networks.

Cast
 Mahnoor Baloch as Falak
 Mikaal Zulfiqar as Ammad
 Natasha Ali as Sharmeen
 Rubina Ashraf as Surayya
 Rabia Noreen as Falak's mother
 Salma Hassan as Nomeer's wife
 Adnan Saeed as Nomeer

Lux Style Awards 
 Best TV Play (Terrestrial)-Nominated 
 Best TV Actress (Terrestrial)-Mahnoor Baloch-Won
 Best TV Writer-Seema Munaf-Nominated

References

Pakistani drama television series
Urdu-language television shows
2012 Pakistani television series debuts